It Ain't My Fault or Ain't My Fault may refer to:
"It Ain't My Fault" (Silkk the Shocker song), 1998
"It Ain't My Fault" (Brothers Osborne song), 2017
"Ain't My Fault", a 2016 song by Zara Larsson
"Ain't My Fault", a 2014 song by Mitch Goudy
"Ain't My Fault", a 2015 song by Jamie Foxx from the album Hollywood: A Story of a Dozen Roses